Khan Chittenden (born 1983 in New Zealand) is a New Zealand-born Australian actor.

Career
Chittenden was born in New Zealand and moved at age 11 to Perth, Western Australia. He graduated from WAAPA (Western Australian Academy of Performing Arts) and landed his first major part as Dean "Edge" Edgely in the television series Blue Water High.   Khan shot numerous commercials and has done much voiceover work for W.A. based agencies Brainestorm and DoubleDragon – as well as appearing in a couple of short films.

Following Blue Water High, Khan signed on for the Foxtel TV series Dangerous and was cast in the globally successful  indie film Clubland (USA title: Introducing the Dwights). The success of this film landed him his first US-based film role in Endless Bummer. He has since also appeared on the stage at His Majesty's Theatre in Perth for Perth Theatre Company's production of Peter Shaffer's Equus.

Filmography 
Home and Away (2014) TV
Canopy (2013)
National Lampoon Presents: Surf Party, Film (2013)
Paper Giants: Magazine Wars (2013) TV Mini Series
Underbelly: Razor (2011) TV
Needle (2010)
Sisters of War (2010) TV
In Her Skin (2009)
Packed to the Rafters (2008) TV
Endless Bummer (2008)
West (2007)  
Clubland (2007) (USA Title: Introducing the Dwights)
Dangerous (2007) TV
Wobbegong (2006) 
The Caterpillar Wish (2006)
The Alice (2005) TV
Blue Water High (2005, 2006) TV
The Gift (1997) TV
In Her Skin (2006)

References

External links 

1983 births
Australian male film actors
Australian male television actors
Australian male child actors
New Zealand emigrants to Australia
Living people
Male actors from Perth, Western Australia
Western Australian Academy of Performing Arts alumni